Adelaide of Savoy may refer to:
Adila, often called Adelaide, wife of Amadeus I, Count of Savoy
Adelaide of Susa (c. 1014/20–1091), daughter of Ulric Manfred II of Turin, wife of Otto I, Count of Savoy
Adelaide of Savoy (died 1079), daughter of Otto I, Count of Savoy and Adelaide of Susa, wife of Rudolf of Rheinfelden
Adelaide (d. aft. 1134), daughter of Amadeus II, Count of Savoy, wife of Manasses, sire de Coligny
Adelaide of Maurienne (1092–1154), daughter of Umberto II, Count of Savoy, married first Louis VI of France and then Matthieu I of Montmorency
Princess Henriette Adelaide of Savoy (1636–1676), daughter of Victor Amadeus I, Duke of Savoy, married Ferdinand Maria, Elector of Bavaria
Princess Marie Adélaïde of Savoy (1685–1712), daughter of Victor Amadeus II, Duke of Savoy, married Louis, Dauphin of France, Duke of Burgundy
Maria Carolina Antonietta Adelaide, better known as Princess Maria Carolina of Savoy (1764–1782), daughter of Victor Amadeus III of Sardinia, married Anthony of Saxony
Maria Adelaide Clothilde Xaveria Borbonia of Savoy (1794–1802), daughter of Victor Emmanuel I of Sardinia
Adelaide of Austria (1822–1855), daughter of Archduke Rainer Joseph of Austria, married Victor Emmanuel II of Sardinia; was Duchess of Savoy prior to husband's accession
Princess Adelaide of Savoy-Genoa, (1904–1979), daughter of Prince Thomas, Duke of Genoa, married Leone Massimo, Prince of Arsoli
Maria Gabriella Giuseppa Aldegonda Adelaide Ludovica Felicita Gennara, better known as Princess Maria Gabriella of Savoy (b. 1940), daughter of Umberto II of Italy, married Robert Zellinger de Balkany
Vittoria Cristina Adelaide Chiara Maria, better known as Princess Vittoria of Savoy (b. 2003), daughter of Emanuele Filiberto, Prince of Venice and Piedmont